The 2015–16 Russian Premier League was the 24th season of the premier football competition in Russia since the dissolution of the Soviet Union and the 14th under the current Russian Premier League name.

Zenit Saint Petersburg came into the season as defending champions of the 2014–15 season. CSKA Moscow won the title on the final day.

Teams 

As in previous season, 16 teams played in the 2015–16 season. After the 2014–15 season, FC Torpedo Moscow and FC Arsenal Tula were relegated to the 2015–16 Russian National Football League. They were replaced by two clubs who qualified automatically from the 2014–15 Russian National Football League, FC Krylia Sovetov Samara and FC Anzhi Makhachkala.

Stadiums

Personnel and sponsorship

Managerial changes

Last updated: 18 May 2016

Tournament format and regulations

Basic 
The 16 teams played a round-robin tournament whereby each team plays each one of the other teams twice, once at home and once away. Thus, a total of 240 matches was played, with 30 matches played by each team.

Promotion and relegation 
The teams that finish 15th and 16th will be relegated to the FNL, while the top 2 in that league will be promoted to the Premier League for the 2016–17 season.

The 13th and 14th Premier League teams will play the 4th and 3rd FNL teams respectively in two playoff games with the winners securing Premier League spots for the 2016–17 season.

League table

Relegation play-offs
The draw for relegation play-offs scheduling took place on 10 May 2016.

First leg

Second leg

Anzhi Makhachkala won 3–0 on aggregate and remained in the 2016–17 Russian Premier League.

Tom Tomsk won 2–1 on aggregate and were promoted to the 2016–17 Russian Premier League.

Results

Positions by round
The table lists the positions of teams after each week of matches. In order to preserve chronological evolvements, any postponed matches are not included to the round at which they were originally scheduled, but added to the full round they were played immediately afterwards.

Season statistics

Scoring
 First goal of the season: Haris Handžić for Ufa against Spartak Moscow (17 July 2015)
 First double: Hulk for Zenit against FC Ural (26 July 2015)
 First hat-trick: Spartak Gogniyev for FC Ural against Anzhi (12 March 2016)
 First poker: Fyodor Smolov for FC Krasnodar against FC Ural (10 April 2016)

Top goalscorers

Last updated: 12 May 2016

Top assists

Last updated: 12 May 2016

Top players by combined goals and assists

Last updated: 12 May 2016

Attendance

Average home attendances

Ranked from highest to lowest average attendance.

Updated as of 1 December 2015

Highest attendances

Season events

Transfer bans
On 3 September 2015, FC Anzhi Makhachkala was banned from registering new players for debts to FC Zenit Saint Petersburg for Igor Denisov's transfer fee. Anzhi's debt was paid and the ban was lifted on 16 December 2015.

On 9 September 2015, FC Dynamo Moscow was banned from registering new players for debts to FC Zenit Saint Petersburg for Igor Denisov's and Tomáš Hubočan's transfer fees and to FC Anzhi Makhachkala for Igor Denisov's, Vladimir Gabulov's and Christopher Samba's transfer fees. On 17 November 2015, the ban was re-confirmed due to new debts to former coaching staff (Stanislav Cherchesov, Miroslav Romaschenko and Vladimir Panikov). Dynamo's debts were paid and the ban was lifted on 15 December 2015.

On 10 September 2015, FC Rostov was banned from registering new players for debts to former player Artyom Dzyuba.
On 8 October 2015, the ban was re-confirmed for debts to FC Spartak Moscow for Artyom Dzyuba's transfer fee. 
On 29 October, the ban was re-confirmed for debts to FC Khimki for Ivan Novoseltsev's transfer fee. 
On 15 November 2015, the ban was re-confirmed for debts to former players Anton Amelchenko and Vitali Dyakov and to FC Zenit Saint Petersburg for Pavel Mogilevets's transfer fee. On 8 December 2015, the ban was re-confirmed for debts to former player Hrvoje Milić and to FC Rubin Kazan for Sardar Azmoun's transfer fee. On 11 February 2016, the ban was re-confirmed for debts to player Nemanja Nikolić. Rostov's debts were paid and the ban was lifted on 24 February 2016.

On 24 September 2015, FC Kuban Krasnodar was banned from registering new players for debts to FC Lokomotiv Moscow for Sergei Tkachyov's transfer fee. On 15 November 2015, the ban was re-confirmed for debts to FC Krylia Sovetov Samara for Anton Sosnin's transfer fee and to PFC CSKA Moscow for Svyatoslav Georgiyevsky's transfer fee. On 25 December 2015, the ban was re-confirmed for debts to former manager Leonid Kuchuk and to FC Dynamo Moscow for Stanislav Manolev's transfer free. On 21 January 2016, the ban was re-confirmed for debts to player Yevgeni Frolov. Kuban's debts were paid and the ban was lifted on 26 February 2016, 7 hours before the winter player registration window would close.

On 25 October 2015, FC Rubin Kazan was banned from registering new players for debts to former conditioning coach Yevgeni Bondarenko. Bondarenko and Rubin agreed on the debt settlement schedule and the ban was lifted on 17 February 2016.

On 8 December 2015, FC Amkar Perm was banned from registering new players for debts to former manager Slavoljub Muslin. Amkar's debt was paid and the ban was lifted on 28 January 2016.

Awards

Top 33
On 31 May 2016, Russian Football Union named its list of 33 top players:

Goalkeepers
 Igor Akinfeev (CSKA)
 Gulherme (Lokomotiv)
 Soslan Dzhanayev (Rostov)

Right backs
 Igor Smolnikov (Zenit)
 Mário Fernandes (CSKA)
 Oleg Kuzmin (Rubin)

Right-centre backs
 Vasili Berezutski (CSKA)
 Vedran Ćorluka (Lokomotiv)
 Andreas Granqvist (Krasnodar)

Left-centre backs
 Sergei Ignashevich (CSKA)
 Ezequiel Garay (Zenit)
 Bastos (Rostov)

Left backs
 Vitaliy Denisov (Lokomotiv)
 Yuri Zhirkov (Dynamo/Zenit)
 Fyodor Kudryashov (Terek/Rostov)

Right defensive midfielders
 Pontus Wernbloom (CSKA)
 Javi García (Zenit)
 Oleg Ivanov (Terek)

Left defensive midfielders
 Alan Dzagoev (CSKA)
 Axel Witsel (Zenit)
 Christian Noboa (Rostov)

Attacking midfielders
 Pavel Mamayev (Krasnodar)
 Danny (Zenit)
 Roman Eremenko (CSKA)

Right wingers
 Hulk (Zenit)
 Quincy Promes (Spartak)
 Aleksandr Samedov (Lokomotiv)

Strikers
 Fyodor Smolov (Krasnodar)
 Artem Dzyuba (Zenit)
 Sardar Azmoun (Rostov)

Left wingers
 Ahmed Musa (CSKA)
 Oleg Shatov (Zenit)
 Dmitry Poloz (Rostov)

References

External links 

Russian Premier League seasons
1
Russian Premier League|Rus